In biochemistry, the term sialome may refer to two distinct concepts:

 The set of mRNA and proteins expressed in the salivary glands, especially of mosquitoes, ticks, and other blood-sucking arthropods.
 The total complement of sialic acid types and linkages and their modes of presentation on a particular organelle, cell, tissue, organ or organism - as found at a particular time and under specific conditions.

References

Biochemistry